Hexahydroborite is a mineral composed of calcium, boron, oxygen, and hydrogen, with formula , more precisely . 

The anion in the structure is tetrahydroxyborate, .

History and occurrence

The mineral was originally described by M. A. Simonov in 1976 from a sample found in a kurchatovite-sakhaite ore deposit in Solongo, Buryat Republic.   The sample was recovered from 200 m underground, associated with pentahydroborite. the hexahydroborite was identified by X-ray diffraction.  Gas/liquid inclusions suggest that the hexahydroborite crystallized after the pentahydroborite. 

The mineral was identified also at a location in Fuka, Japan. It occurred in a layer between crystalline limestone and skarns, in association with olshanskyite and calcite.  It was conjectured to be formed by hydrothermal alteration of takaedite at low temperatures, around 250 °C.

The mineral was synthesized in 2011.

Structure
The structure (observed in the synthetic material) consists of infinite columns parallel to the c axis, identically oriented, displaced along the other two axes and linked only by hydrogen bonds. The columns are formed by calcium polyhedra linked together and to  orthotetrahedra by sharing edges. 

The crystal cell is monoclinic with the following parameters:

The density calculated for the synthetic version is 1.891 g/cm3.

Properties
The mineral occurs in nature as flattened prismatic crystals, clear and transparent, with density 1.84 to 1.87 g/cm3 and Mohs hardness 2.5.  The crystals may exhibit bluish-white photoluminescence.

The mineral is optically biaxial positive with 2V = 83°. The refractive index is 1.50, with slightly increasing values for α, β, and γ; the difference γ−α is 0.012 by Simonov, and 0.007 by Kusachi. It has strong dispersion, increasing from violet to red. 

The compound is slowly soluble in water and insoluble in ethanol, contradicting an earlier report. It is promptly dissolved by hydrochloric, sulfuric, and acetic acid. On heating, it loses a significant amount of water between 90 and 110 °C, but dehydration is complete only over 800 °C, leaving anhydrous calcium metaborate .

References
 

Boron minerals